Awan Kalan is a town and union council of Depalpur Tehsil in the Okara District of Punjab Province, Pakistan. The town is located at 30°43'60N 73°46'60E and is part of the NA-16 constituency of the National Assembly.

See also 
 Awans of Pakistan

References

Union councils of Okara District